
Ruqaiyah Khadijah "Kiah" Morris (born March 14, 1976) is an American politician who formerly served as a member of the Vermont House of Representatives for the Democratic Party.

Early life and education
Born in Chicago, Morris earned a B.A. in Gender Studies from the University of Illinois, Urbana-Champaign and a graduate degree from Roosevelt University.

Political career
Morris was first elected in 2014 alongside longtime Republican representative Mary A. Morrissey. The two were reelected in 2016 after running unopposed. The only African American woman in the state legislature, Morris announced in August 2018 that she would not seek reelection to a third term following a campaign of racist threats against her and her family. She resigned the following month, citing as an additional factor the desire to focus on her husband's recovery from open-heart surgery.

Morris has also served as director of the Alliance for Community Transformations, based in Bennington.

Electoral history

Personal life
Morris is married to James Lawton. They have a son.

References

External links
Profile at Vote Smart
Twitter account

Living people
1976 births
People from Bennington, Vermont
Politicians from Chicago
Democratic Party members of the Vermont House of Representatives
University of Illinois Urbana-Champaign alumni
African-American state legislators in Vermont
Women state legislators in Vermont
21st-century American politicians
21st-century American women politicians
21st-century African-American women
21st-century African-American politicians
20th-century African-American people
20th-century African-American women